Glengary Township is one of fifteen townships in Fillmore County, Nebraska, United States. The population was 339 at the 2020 census.

The village of Milligan lies within the township.

See also
County government in Nebraska

References

External links
City-Data.com

Townships in Fillmore County, Nebraska
Townships in Nebraska